Old Fort House may refer to:

 Harlow Old Fort House, Plymouth, Massachusetts, listed on the NRHP in Massachusetts
Old Fort House (Columbus, Mississippi), listed on the NRHP in Mississippi
Old Fort House (Fort Edward, New York), listed on the NRHP in New York